Tmesiphantes yupanqui is a species of spider in the subfamily Theraphosinae of the family Theraphosidae. It is endemic to Argentina.

Taxonomy
The species was first described in 2014 as Melloleitaoina yupanqui. The specific name yupanqui is in honour of Atahualpa Yupanqui, a famous musician and a synonym of Héctor Aramburu. In 2019, it was transferred to the genus Tmesiphantes.

Characteristics
Tmesiphantes yupanqui has a very curved embolus with no triangular spine, and a discontinued prolateral superior keel (still on the embolus) which separates into two keels. The female spermathecae are short and with large granules.

References

Theraphosidae
Spiders of Argentina
Spiders described in 2014